The 1713 British general election produced further gains for the governing Tory party. Since 1710 Robert Harley had led a government appointed after the downfall of the Whig Junto, attempting to pursue a moderate and non-controversial policy, but had increasingly struggled to deal with the extreme Tory backbenchers who were frustrated by the lack of support for anti-dissenter legislation. The government remained popular with the electorate, however, having helped to end the War of the Spanish Succession and agreeing on the Treaty of Utrecht. The Tories consequently made further gains against the Whigs, making Harley's job even more difficult. Contests were held in 94 constituencies in England and Wales, some 35 per cent of the total, reflecting a decline in partisan tension and the Whigs' belief that they were unlikely to win anyway.

Summary of the constituencies
See 1796 British general election for details. The constituencies used were the same throughout the existence of the Parliament of Great Britain.

Dates of election
The general election was held between 22 August 1713 and 12 November 1713. At this period elections did not take place at the same time in every constituency. The returning officer in each county or parliamentary borough fixed the precise date (see hustings for details of the conduct of the elections).

Results

Seats summary

See also
 List of MPs elected in the British general election, 1713
 4th Parliament of Great Britain
 List of parliaments of Great Britain

Notes

References
 British Electoral Facts 1832–1999, compiled and edited by Colin Rallings and Michael Thrasher (Ashgate Publishing Ltd 2000). (For dates of elections before 1832, see the footnote to Table 5.02).

External links
 History of Parliament: Members 1690–1715
 History of Parliament: Constituencies 1690–1715

1713 in politics
1713 in Great Britain
1713